In the electoral system for the French National Assembly, there is a first round. If a candidate obtains more than 50% of the vote and more than 25% of the total enrolment for the constituency, they are elected. Otherwise, a second round election is held, only first-round candidates with the support of at least 12.5% of eligible voters are allowed to participate, but if only 1 candidate meets that standard the two candidates with the highest number of votes in the first round may continue to the second round. In the second round, the candidate with a plurality is elected.

These are the deputies elected in the first round in 2022.

References

See also 

 List of deputies elected in the first round of the 2017 French legislative election

2022 French legislative election
France politics-related lists